This is a list of airlines which have a current Air Operator Certificate issued by the Civil Aviation Authority of Singapore.

Scheduled airlines

Cargo airlines

See also
 List of airlines
 List of defunct airlines of Singapore
 List of airports in Singapore
 List of defunct airlines of Asia

Singapore
Airlines
Airlines
Singapore